Hugh Roberts may refer to:

 Sir Hugh Roberts (art historian) (born 1948), British art historian
 Hugh Roberts (architect) (1867–1928), American architect
 Hugh Roberts (footballer) (1882–1969), Welsh footballer
 Hugh Roberts (politician) (born 1880), Welsh politician and trade unionist
 Hugh Roberts (soccer) (born 1992), American soccer player